Sir Henry Cavendish, 1st Baronet (13 April 1707 – 31 May 1776) was a British politician who held several appointments in the Kingdom of Ireland.

Biography
Cavendish was the son of William Cavendish and Mary Tyrell. He was descended from Sir William Cavendish, an ancestor shared with the Dukes of Devonshire. Cavendish studied at University College, Oxford, matriculating on  17 August 1724.

He held the office of High Sheriff of Derbyshire in 1741. He was responsible for the construction of Doveridge Hall, in Doveridge, Derbyshire. He subsequently moved to Ireland, where he became Teller of the Exchequer in the Irish government and Collector for Cork in 1743. He became Commissioner of Revenue in Ireland in 1747. Cavendish was created a baronet on 7 May 1755, of Doveridge in the County of Derby, in the Baronetage of Great Britain.  He was elected to the Irish House of Commons as the Member of Parliament for Lismore in 1761, serving until 1768. He was invested as a member of the Privy Council of Ireland on 9 June 1768.

Cavendish married firstly Anne Pyne, the daughter of Henry Pyne and Anne Edgecumbe, on 9 January 1730. Together they had six children. He married secondly Catherine Prittie, daughter of Henry Prittie and Elizabeth Harrison, on 4 October 1748, and they had one son. He was succeeded in his title by his eldest son, Sir Henry Cavendish, 2nd Baronet.

References

1707 births
1776 deaths
Baronets in the Baronetage of Great Britain
18th-century Anglo-Irish people
Henry
Irish MPs 1761–1768
Members of the Parliament of Ireland (pre-1801) for County Waterford constituencies
Members of the Privy Council of Ireland
High Sheriffs of Derbyshire
People from Derbyshire Dales (district)